Peel Regional Council is the governing body of the Regional Municipality of Peel, Ontario, Canada.

Formation
Peel Council was formed in 1973 when the Regional Municipality of Peel was created to replace the old Peel County. It was created by the province to deal with counties with significant growth patterns. It is supposed to mimic the role of the former Metro Toronto Council.

Political Structure
It currently consists of 25 members: the mayors of Mississauga, Brampton, and Caledon, eleven councillors from Mississauga, six councillors from Brampton, four additional councillors from Caledon, and the regional chair, who is appointed by council members. These members are elected via double direct election.

 Caledon Councillors Wards 1-6 and Mayor
 Brampton Councillors Wards 1-10 and Mayor
 Mississauga Councillors Wards 1-11 and Mayor

A list of past and present chair (or chairmen of Peel Council):

 1973-1979 Chairman Lou H. Parsons (GO Transit Chair and Mississauga City Councillor)
 1979-1991 Chairman R. Frank Bean (former Mississauga City Alderman)
 1981 Acting Chairman Peter Robertson (Mayor of Brampton)
 1991 Acting Chairman Frank Russell (Brampton)
 1991 Acting Chairman Edward (Ted) Southorn (Mississauga Ward 7 Councillor)
 1991 Acting Chairman Rhoda Begley (Regional Councillor and Brampton City Councillor)
 1992-2014 Chairman Emil Kolb (former Mayor of Caledon)
 2014-2018 Chair Frank Dale (former Mississauga Ward 4 Councillor)
 2018–present Chair Nando Iannicca (former Mississauga Ward 7 Councillor)

Wards

The Peel wards are based on the ward system of each city, so there are repeated ward numbers:

 Caledon Wards 1-4 and Mayor
 Brampton Wards 1-10 and Mayor
 Mississauga Wards 1-11 and Mayor

County Buildings/Peel Centre

 1973-1980 - Peel County Courthouse, Brampton, Ontario
 1980–present - 10 Peel Centre Drive in Brampton, Ontario.

In 2014, the inaugural meeting of council met at Mississauga Convention Centre.

In 2018, the inaugural meeting of council met at 10 Peel Centre Drive Council Chambers

Services

 Peel Regional Police
 Peel Health Services
 Peel Regional Paramedic Services
 long-term care facilities
 Social Services
 Child Care Centres
 Ontario Works
 Volunteer workers
 Public Works
 Transhelp
 Regional Road and maintenance
 Water/Wastewater system
 Construction
 Garbage disposal - collected from the cities and towns in Peel
 Education
 Peel District School Board
 Dufferin-Peel Catholic District School Board
 Public Housing

Current Council

Council elected in the 2014 municipal election:

Past Councils
Council elected in the 2010 municipal election:

Other Officials

Executive Leadership Team
 David Szwarc, Chief Administrative Officer
 Janice Sheehy, Commissioner of Human Services 
 Catherine Matheson, Commissioner of Corporate Services
 Janette Smith, Commissioner of Public Works
 Sean Baird, Commissioner of Service Innovation, Information and Technology 
 Nancy Polsinelli, Commissioner of Health Services 
 Steven VanOfwegen, Commissioner of Finance and Chief Financial Officer

See also

 Greater Toronto Area
 Durham Regional Council
 York Regional Council

References

External links
 Peel Council

Regional Municipality of Peel
County and regional councils in Ontario